The 2022 Nauruan presidential election was the 32nd presidential election in the Republic of Nauru.  According to the Constitution of Nauru, the president is elected by the Parliament, and must also be a sitting member of the Parliament. Independent candidate Russ Kun was elected unchallenged president on 28 September. The election was held four days after the parliamentary elections of the same year.

Results

See also 
 Nauru
 2022 Nauruan parliamentary election

References 

Presidential elections in Nauru
President
Uncontested elections
Nauru